Mir-Mohsun Navvab (1833, in Shusha – 1918, in Shusha) occupies a prominent place in the history of Azerbaijani culture as the last representative of the old traditional school of science, arts and literature. Navvab was versatile person of his time. He is known as a poet, artist, music historian, astronomer, carpenter, chemist and mathematician.

Navvab was born in 1833 in Shusha and spent all his life in this city. His life and works reflect a period of history, when Azerbaijan was on the turning point of old and new, traditional and novel trends in culture and general way of life. And although, Navvab remained a traditionalist in the arts, he was a progressive person in the public life of Karabakh, who did a lot for the growth of literacy, culture and arts in Karabakh.

Navvab created first typography in Shusha, which was also the first typography in Azerbaijan. He published the poems of Karabakh poets and spread them among the local population. Navvab established a second literary society in Azerbaijan called “Majlis-i-Faramushan” (‘Society of the Forgotten') and also established the first music society “Majlis-i-Khanende” (‘Society of Singers').

Navvab wrote more than 20 books dedicated to various fields of science and arts. He is the author of “Vuzuh-ul-Argam” (‘Explanation of the numbers'), a significant work which offers 82 mugams (an original improvisational classical folk music popular in Azerbaijan) and songs, performed in Karabakh at that time. He also provides information about the origins of these mugams and the rules for their performance. Navvab is also the author of the book “Tezkirey-i-Navvab”, which gives information about one hundred poets and writers of Karabakh at the time.

Navvab was also a talented artist. He illustrated his manuscripts with colorful pictures and portraits, and also decorated the interiors of the buildings with various ornaments. Before Shusha's occupation by the Armenian forces in 1992 some of these wall decorations were preserved in the house where he lived, school where he taught and the Minarets of the Shusha's main Upper Govharaga Mosque. Navvab died in 1918 in Shusha.

See also 
 Gravestone of Mir Mohsun Navvab

References

Scientists from Shusha
1833 births
1918 deaths
Azerbaijani musicologists
Writers from Shusha